Plasmodium georgesi is a parasite of the genus Plasmodium subgenus Plasmodium.

Like all Plasmodium species P. georgesi has both vertebrate and insect hosts. The vertebrate hosts for this parasite are mammals.

Description
This species was first described by Poirriez et al. in 1993.

The trophozoites have long crescent-shaped nuclei (surface area 2.18 +/- 0.25 square micrometres).

The pigment is stored as short rods.

Geographical occurrence
Plasmodium georgesi has been found in the Central African Republic.

Clinical features and host pathology
Plasmodium georgesi, Plasmodium petersi and Plasmodium gonderi are the only Plasmodium species found to date (2008) in Cercocebus monkeys.

P. georgesi infects Cercocebus albigena and Cercocebus galeritus agilis causing a remitting/relapsing form of malaria.

References

georgesi